Imperial and Royal Field Marshal is a 1956 Austrian historical comedy film directed by E. W. Emo and starring Rudolf Vogel, Gretl Schörg, and Mady Rahl.

It was shot at the Schönbrunn Studios in Vienna. The film's sets were designed by the art director Wolf Witzemann. It was shot in Agfacolor.

Cast

References

Bibliography

External links 
 

1956 films
Austrian historical comedy films
1950s historical comedy films
1950s German-language films
Films directed by E. W. Emo
Schönbrunn Studios films
Films scored by Hans Lang
Films set in Austria-Hungary